Off the Hook: Extreme Catches is an American reality television series that aired on Animal Planet and premiered on July 30, 2012. It was hosted by wrestler Eric Young, who journeys out to meet and fish with the most unusual fishermen he can find.

Episodes
Re-runs of episodes began airing on the Discovery Channel.

Season 1

Season 2

Reception
Common Sense Media rated it 4 out of 5 stars.

References

External links

 Off the Hook: Extreme Catches Season 2 episodes at TV Guide

Animal Planet original programming
2012 American television series debuts
2010s American reality television series
Fishing television series